Darevskia clarkorum is a species of lizard in the family Lacertidae. The species is native to the Republic of Georgia and Turkey.

Etymology
The specific name, clarkorum (genitive plural), is in honor of American zoologists Richard J. Clark and Erica D. Clark, who are husband and wife.

Geographic range
D. clarkorum is found in Adjara in southwestern Georgia, and also in adjacent northeastern Turkey.

Habitat

Reproduction
D. clarkorum is oviparous.

References

Further reading
Bischoff W (2007). "Auf der Suche nach Gebirgseidechsen in drei Erdteilen [=Searching for mountain lizards on three continents]". Draco 7: 54–73. (in German).
Darevsky IS, Vedmederja VI (1977). "[A new species of rock lizard of the Lacerta saxicola Eversmann group from northeastern Turkey and adjoining regions of Adjaria]". [Trudy Zoological Institute and Academy, Nauk SSSR ] 74: 50–54. (Lacerta clarkorum, new species). (in Russian, with an abstract in English).
Sindaco R, Jeremčenko VK (2008). The Reptiles of the Western Palearctic. 1. Annotated Checklist and Distributional Atlas of the Turtles, Crocodiles, Amphisbaenians and Lizards of Europe, North Africa, Middle East and Central Asia. (Monographs of the Societas Herpetologica Italica). Laina, Italy: Edizioni Belvedere. 580 pp. .

Darevskia
Reptiles described in 1977
Taxa named by Ilya Darevsky
Taxa named by Valery Iosiphovich Vedmederja
Taxonomy articles created by Polbot